This is list of European countries by unemployment and employment rate.

Map

Table

See also
International organisations in Europe 
List of European regions by unemployment rate
List of European countries by budget revenues
List of European countries by GDP (nominal) per capita
List of European countries by GDP (PPP) per capita 
List of European countries by GNI (nominal) per capita 
List of European countries by GNI (PPP) per capita 
List of countries by GDP (nominal) per capita
List of countries by GDP (PPP) per capita
List of countries by GDP (nominal)
List of countries by GDP (PPP)

Notes

References

 Employment rate in the EU27 fell to 64.6% in 2009
 Countries surrounding the EU

Lists of countries in Europe
Unemployment rate, Europe
Europe, Unemployment Rate
Europe
Economy of Europe-related lists